The Island Princess is a 1954 Italian-Spanish adventure film directed by Paolo Moffa.

Plot
The story takes place in 15th-century Spain. Canarian forces rise against Castille. Backup troops arrive on the island of Gran Canaria for aid due to the rising power of the Grancanarians. However opinions about the war differ in the royal class. Guanarteme the king and his daughter want peace. On the other hand, the warrior leader and the high priest want war.

One day, Castillian officer Don Hernán falls in love with the king's daughter, despite the difference in their status. The high priest poisons the king fatally, and then tries to marry the princess. Soon after, the embassy of Castille, including Don Hernán, arrives for the peace. His confession of love in his camp causes war.

The princess and the high priest marry, despite the Castillian troops advancing. The princess runs away with the high priest to the mountains of Tirma. Don Hernán follows them and does not let the princess fall off the cliffs with the high priest. However, she is disgusted by him and utters the torn Guanche oath.

Cast
 Silvana Pampanini as Almadena
 Marcello Mastroianni as Don Diego
 Gustavo Rojo as Bentejui
 José María Lado as High priest
 Elvira Quintillá as Tasirga
 José María Rodero as Don Alvaro
 Félix de Pomés as Guanazteml

Production
The film was shot in the Canary Islands. Subsequently, Mastroiani recalled the shooting: “Hellish heat! And then there are weapons, horses, and everything else that I have never dealt with. Moreover, these horses (which I gave to the “princess” on behalf of the King of Spain) had neither tails, nor manes, so they had to fix them with ropes. Crazy work! .. "

References

External links

1954 films
1954 adventure films
1950s Italian-language films
Italian black-and-white films
Films shot in the Canary Islands
Films set in the Canary Islands
Films directed by Paolo Moffa
Films set on islands
Italian adventure films
Spanish adventure films
1950s Italian films